Real Time (Discovery Real Time until August 31, 2010) is an Italian television channel owned by Warner Bros. Discovery EMEA.

The channel launched on October 1, 2005, becoming the sixth Discovery network to launch in Italy. It showed lifestyle programmes targeting a female upper-class audience of 25- to 44-year-olds. It features both foreign programmes and Italian programmes produced for the channel.

On April 7, 2009, the channel adopted a new logo and a new look. This look had previously been adopted by Discovery Real Time France.

After becoming the most viewed non-fiction entertainment channel on the Sky Italia platform, on September 1, 2010, it changed its name to "Real Time", and became available both on digital terrestrial and via free-to-air satellite, also joining the Tivùsat platform.

On November 8, 2010, the +1 version of the channel was born and from February 1, 2012, it also broadcasts in high definition.

On March 13, 2019, definitively closes the SD version on the satellite.

From April 9 Real Time, together with the other free channels of the group, is also available in HD streaming on the Dplay platform.

From March 1, 2019, on Tivùsat, the "HD" and "+1" versions replace the SD version, therefore they become visible to LCN 31 and 131 respectively.

On December 1, 2020, Real Time +1 was shut down.

The channel broadcasts both foreign programmes and a few original Italian productions. Most acquired programmes were originally produced for the American TLC or the British Channel 4.

Original programs

 Cerco casa disperatamente
 Chef a domicilio
 Clio Make Up
 Com'è fatto con Barbara
 Cortesie per gli ospiti
 Cortesie per gli ospiti New York
 Cucina con Ale
 Cuoco gentiluomo
 Diario di un chirurgo
 Dimmi di sì
 Donne mortali
 Fuori menù
 Guardaroba perfetto
 Il re del cioccolato
 Il boss delle cerimonie
 Life Shock
 L'eleganza del maschio
 L'ost
 Ma come ti vesti?!
 Mamma mia
 Matrimonio all'italiana
 Merry Christmas con Csaba
 Non solo magre
 Paint Your Life
 Reparto maternità
 Se balli ti sposo
 Shopping night
 Stelle e padelle 
 Torte in corso con Renato
 Tutto in un Weekend
 Vendo casa disperatamente
 Wedding Planners
 Shopping Night
 Zenzero

Imported programs

 24 ore in sala parto
 290 chili, vergine
 Abito da damigella cercasi
 Abito da sposa: Beverly Hills (Brides of Beverly Hills)
 Abito da sposa cercasi
 Abito da sposa cercasi XXL
 Adolescenti XXL (Too Fat for 15)
 Basta: io o il cane Bimbi fatti in casa Cher: Mia figlia cambia sesso (Becoming Chaz)
 Chirurgia XXL Cucina con Buddy (Kitchen Boss)
 Emozioni in vitro
 Fantasmi
 Gite gastronomiche
 Il cibo ti fa bella Australia
 Il giardiniere
 Il mio grosso grasso matrimonio gypsy (My Big Fat Gypsy Wedding)
 Io e la mia ossessione (My Strange Addiction)
 I peggiori cuochi d'America
 Jo Frost: SOS genitori (Supernanny)
 L'aggiustatutto a domicilio La fabbrica del cioccolato Little Miss America (Toddlers & Tiaras)
 Mad Fashion
 Malattie imbarazzanti (Embarrassing Bodies)
 Malattie imbarazzanti XXL Malattie misteriose Mamme che amano troppo Million Dollar Decorators Mob Wives Monster House My Shocking Body Non sapevo di essere incinta Obiettivo peso forma'
 Party Mamas
 Pazzi per la spesa (Extreme Couponing)
 Quattro matrimoni (Four Weddings)
 School Mum Makeover
 Sepolti in casa (Hoarding: Buried Alive)
 Storia di un bebè (A conception story)
 Tabatha mani di forbice (Tabatha Takes Over)
 Torte da record
 Transgender e incinta
 Vita al pronto soccorso (24 Hours in A&E )
 Cucina con Buddy (Kitchen Boss)
 Cucine da incubo USA (Kitchen Nightmares)
 Cucine da incubo (Kitchen Nightmares)
 Extreme Makeover: Diet Edition (Extreme Makeover: Weight Loss Edition)
 Fashion Star Grassi contro magri (Supersize vs Superskinny)
 Grassi contro magri teenager
 Il boss delle torte (Cake Boss)
 Il boss delle torte: la sfida (Next Great Baker)
 Top Chef Masters (Top Chef Masters)
 Top chef:solo dessert (Top Chef: Just Desserts)
 Top Gear

Presenters
Roberto Ruspoli
Enzo Miccio
Renato Ardovino

African version 
In 2018, An English version which took its content from TLC alongside other Discovery brands with the same styling as the Italian version was also made available in South Africa from 3 September through MultiChoice's DStv and a year later across Africa. The channel is also available to StarTimes and Canal+ Afrique within the region.
Real Time is now on Zuku TV channel 102 replacing Fine Living on channel 710 in January 2021.

References

External links
 Official Websites: realtimetv.it 
 Real Time channel on YouTube

Warner Bros. Discovery networks
Television channels in Italy
Television channels and stations established in 2005
Warner Bros. Discovery EMEA